Junius Marcellus Updyke Farm is a historic home and farm located near Bland, Bland County, Virginia. The house was built about 1910, and is a two-story, three bay, single-pile, I-house, with a two-story rear ell to its rear.  It also has a one-story wing and porch.  It has a gable roof with pent roofs at the ends and a full-width front porch supported by Ionic order columns. Also on the property are a contributing two-story smokehouse (c. 1910), granary (c. 1910), chicken house (c. 1920), storage shed (c. 1910), barn (c. 1955), and family cemetery.

It was listed on the National Register of Historic Places in 2012.

References

Houses on the National Register of Historic Places in Virginia
Farms on the National Register of Historic Places in Virginia
Houses completed in 1910
Houses in Bland County, Virginia
National Register of Historic Places in Bland County, Virginia
1910 establishments in Virginia